The Trnava Region is one of the eight Slovak administrative regions. It was established in 1996, before which date most of its districts were parts of Bratislava Region which was established on the founding of Czechoslovakia in 1923. It consists of 251 municipalities, from which 16 have a town status. It is the second most densely populated region in Slovakia.

Geography
In the lower, west part of Slovakia, the Trnava region forms a territorial band between the Bratislava Region and the rest of Slovakia, between Austrian and Czech borders in the north and north-west and the Hungarian border in the south. The part north of the Little Carpathians is part of the Záhorie Lowland, with its two subdivisions: hilly Chvojnická pahorkatina and flat Borská nížina. In addition to these, the Myjava Hills and the White Carpathians reach into the area. The fertile Danubian Lowland is located south of the Little Carpathians, again with two subdivisions: the Danubian Flat in the south, containing river island of Žitný ostrov (Rye Island) and the Danubian Hills in the north, where it also borders the Považský Inovec range app. on the line Hlohovec - Piešťany - border with the Trenčín Region. Major rivers are the Danube on the Hungarian border, with part of the Gabčíkovo Dam, Little Danube, which creates with Danube the island of Žitný ostrov,  Váh in the east, Dudváh in the centre, and Morava River in the north-west, along the Austrian and Czech borders. The region borders: Austrian Lower Austria and Czech South Moravian Region in the north-west, Trenčín Region in the north, Nitra Region in the east, Hungarian Győr-Moson-Sopron county in the south and Bratislava Region in the west.

Demographics

In terms of population, the region is smallest of all Slovak regions. Largest towns are Trnava, Piešťany, Hlohovec, Dunajská Streda and Sereď. The level of urbanization is around 49%, represented by inhabitants living in 16 towns. According to the 2001 census, the region had 551,003 inhabitants, with Slovaks forming a majority (73.9%), but there is a significant Hungarian minority in the south (23.7%), forming a majority in the Dunajská Streda District (87%) and are notably represented in the Galanta District (41%). Other minorities are the Czechs and Roma (<1%).

Economy 
The region is quite productive in both industry and agriculture. The proximity to the capital city of Bratislava is an asset, as many Trnava residents travel daily to work there. Lately, multinational manufacturing companies such as Peugeot or Samsung settled in the region.

Politics
Current governor of Trnava region is Jozef Viskupič (OĽaNO). He won with 42,9 %. In election 2017 was elected also regional parliament :

Administrative division
The Trnava Region consists of 7 districts. There are 251 municipalities in the region of which 16 are towns.

See also
 List of municipalities and towns in Slovakia

References
Notes

Bibliography

Genealogical resources

The records for genealogical research are available at the state archive "Statny Archiv in Bratislava, Slovakia"

 Lutheran church records (births/marriages/deaths): 1701-1896 (parish B)

External links
Trnavský samosprávny kraj Official website
Surnames of living people in Janovce

 
Regions of Slovakia